Fyer (also known as Fier) is a West Chadic language spoken in Plateau State, Nigeria.

Notes
The Fyer tribe has a population of approximately 35,000 people. It is an endangered ethnic group with a declining knowledge of its culture and language.

References

West Chadic languages
Languages of Nigeria